David John Lea (4 July 1935 – 17 January 2021) was an Australian politician.

He was born in Stourbridge in Worcestershire, England, to Sidney Lea, a managing director, and Winifred Greaves, a secretary. The family arrived in Melbourne in 1948, and David attended Melbourne High School (1949–52) and then the University of Melbourne, where he received a Bachelor of Arts in 1957, a Diploma of Education in 1958 and a Bachelor of Education in 1966. 

He worked as an English teacher and examiner throughout the 1960s, and later as a school principal. In 1985 he was elected to the Victorian Legislative Assembly as the Liberal member for Sandringham. A backbencher, he was re-elected in 1988 and was preselected to contest the seat in 1992, but resigned shortly before the election.

References

1935 births
2021 deaths
Liberal Party of Australia members of the Parliament of Victoria
Members of the Victorian Legislative Assembly
English emigrants to Australia
People from Stourbridge